Mary Ellen Ray (3 January 1931 – 10 September 2004) was an American-born actress who had a career in the United Kingdom.

Early life 
She was born as Mary Ellen McPherson in Springfield, Missouri in 1931 to 17 year-old Hayzle McPherson and her husband Owen M. McPherson. Following her parents' divorce in 1937 and her mother's remarriage to Earl Ray, she assumed her stepfather's surname.

Career 
Ray spent two years with the ACT Theatre after which she went to the American Shakespeare Festival Theatre at Stratford, Connecticut where she appeared in such plays as The Crucible, Endgame and Under Milk Wood. She made her début at the Stratford Festival at Stratford, Ontario in 1970 as Mariana in All's Well That Ends Well and Mrs William Dudgeon in The Devil's Disciple. In September 1970 she opened in Othello at the American Shakespeare Festival Theatre and appeared with repertory companies in the United States and Britain. The couple separated in 1972 and divorced in 1974.

She made her first television appearance in Britain as Telephone Operator in Long Distance (1958) before acting in the 'Shadow of Heroes' episode of BBC Sunday-Night Theatre (1959). Next she was Waitress in 'The Out-of-Towners' episode of ITV Television Playhouse (1960). Ray progressed to the named role of Nora in 'The Closed Shop' episode of Somerset Maugham Hour (1962) and Miss Cleaver in 'The Night of the Horns' episode of Detective (1964). She was in Theatre 625 (1966), voiced Mrs Dilber in the Oscar-winning animated television special A Christmas Carol (1971) and was Mary Crane in the short Some Kind of Hero (1972). She was Sonia in the television film Artemis 81 (1981); Nursing Staff in the film The Sender (1982); Mrs Bear in the film The Lords of Discipline (1983), and American Wife in the film Invitation to the Wedding (1983).

She was Mrs. Abrams in the television series Tender Is the Night (1985); Aunt Hannah in Back Home (1989); Lynn Nesbit in Selling Hitler (1991); Landlady in Jeeves and Wooster (1992); Teacher in the episode 'I Don't Do Cuddles' of Unnatural Pursuits (1992); Rose Whitfield in The Bill (1994); Marie in the episode 'First Impressions' of Holby City (2000), and Eleanor Forsyth in Doctors (2004). In 1993 she played Mrs Pascal in The House of Yes at the Gate Theatre in London.

Personal life 
In 1952, as a 21-year-old secretary, Ray sailed on the RMS Queen Mary from New York to Spain with her two younger siblings and her mother, Hayzle Ray. There, she met the British poet Anthony Edkins (1927–2018) who was teaching English in Ibiza in Spain. The two returned to England until her visa expired leading to their marriage in 1955 in Madrid; the couple had two daughters, Sarah Edkins and Lucy Edkins, a stage manager and actress. In 1966 she and Edkins moved to the United States for three years to allow Ray to pursue her acting career.

Ray died in Kensington in London in 2004 aged 73.

Filmography

Film

Television

References

External links

1931 births
2004 deaths
People from Springfield, Missouri
20th-century American actresses
21st-century American actresses
American film actresses
American Shakespearean actresses
American stage actresses
American television actresses
American voice actresses